McGowen is an English language surname. The more common Anglicization of Mac Gobhann is McGowan. Notable people, having the surname alternatively spelled McGowen or Gowen include:

Franklin B. Gowen, attorney, president of Reading Railroad 
James McGowen, Premier of New South Wales (1910–1913)
Lorraine McGowen, American lawyer

See also
McGowan, containing detailed etymology and history common to both the McGowan and McGowen surnames
McGowen Station, METRORail station in Houston, Texas.

References

Anglicised Irish-language surnames